Huai Yang railway station is a railway station located in Saeng Arun Subdistrict, Thap Sakae District, Prachuap Khiri Khan.

Thai minibuses and motorbike taxis are available to both of these attractions.

Train services 
 Ordinary 254/255 Lang Suan-Thon Buri-Lang Suan
 Special Express 40 Surat Thani-Bangkok
 Special Express 43 Bangkok-Surat Thani

References 

 
 

Railway stations in Thailand